The Denville Township School District is a comprehensive public school district serving students in pre-kindergarten through eighth grade from Denville Township, in Morris County, New Jersey, United States in two elementary schools and a middle school.

As of the 2018–19 school year, the district, comprising three schools, had an enrollment of 1,629 students and 152.9 classroom teachers (on an FTE basis), for a student–teacher ratio of 10.7:1.

The district is classified by the New Jersey Department of Education as being in District Factor Group "I", the second-highest of eight groupings. District Factor Groups organize districts statewide to allow comparison by common socioeconomic characteristics of the local districts. From lowest socioeconomic status to highest, the categories are A, B, CD, DE, FG, GH, I and J.

Students in public school for ninth through twelfth grades attend Morris Knolls High School, which is located in Denville, but has a Rockaway address, along with most students from Rockaway Township. The high school is part of the Morris Hills Regional High School District, which also serves the residential communities of Rockaway Borough and Wharton. As of the 2018–19 school year, the high school had an enrollment of 1,434 students and 128.4 classroom teachers (on an FTE basis), for a student–teacher ratio of 11.2:1.

Awards and recognition
Riverview Elementary School was one of nine schools in New Jersey honored in 2020 by the National Blue Ribbon Schools Program, which recognizes high student achievement.

Schools
Schools in the district (with 2018–19 enrollment data from the National Center for Education Statistics) are:
Elementary schools
Lakeview Elementary School with 649 students in grades PreK-5
Beth Baisley
Riverview Elementary School with 382 students in grades K-5
Tina Theodoropoulos, Principal
Middle school
Valleyview Middle School with 587 students in grades 6-8
Seth Korman, Principal

Administration
Core members of the district's administration are:
Steven Forte, Superintendent
Damaris Gurowsky, Business Administrator / Board Secretary

Board of education
The district's board of education, comprised of seven members, sets policy and oversees the fiscal and educational operation of the district through its administration. As a Type II school district, the board's trustees are elected directly by voters to serve three-year terms of office on a staggered basis, with either two or three seats up for election each year held (since 2012) as part of the November general election. The board appoints a superintendent to oversee the day-to-day operation of the district.

References

External links
Denville Township School District
 
School Data for the Denville Township School District, National Center for Education Statistics

Denville Township, New Jersey
New Jersey District Factor Group I
School districts in Morris County, New Jersey